The Men's 10,000 metres competition at the 2019 World Single Distances Speed Skating Championships was held on 9 February 2019.

Results
The race was started at 15:49.

References

Men's 10,000 metres